Admiral Richardson may refer to:

Bruce Richardson (Royal Navy officer) (born 1941), British Royal Navy rear admiral
Charles Richardson (Royal Navy officer) (1769–1850), British Royal Navy vice admiral
David C. Richardson (admiral) (1914–2015), U.S. Navy vice admiral
James O. Richardson (1878–1974), U.S. Navy admiral
John M. Richardson (admiral) (born 1960), U.S. Navy admiral